Duck Stab! is a 7-inch extended play by the Residents, released in 1978 through the Ralph Records label.  The songs were later remixed and re-released (albeit in a different order) as side one of their Duck Stab/Buster & Glen album.

Background 
Originally a side project for the Residents, Duck Stab! is very different from the Residents' previous works, which features clear and understandable, if nonsensical lyrics, as well as crafted and complex instrumentals. Despite the primitive equipment available for them at the time, the Residents managed to create a diverse sounding record.

Duck Stab! was intended to have a follow up EP titled Buster & Glenn, which would be released later in that same year. Yet, that second EP was combined with Duck Stab! to make a single album, which was done to improve the general sound quality. The record was a critical success. Whilst some noted that the Residents were approaching commercial elements with this EP, it was noted that they were purposefully avoiding others, such as a traditional chorus/verse structure.

Track listing

Reception 

In an unusual turn, the Residents quickly sold out of their original pressing. Duck Stab! is considered to be a vast improvement on the previous year's Fingerprince and the best starting point for any fan.

In a review for Allmusic, Kieran McCarthy concluded that, although the songs on Duck Stab! were sparse and strange, the release is an "essential" part of the Residents' discography.

References in Popular Culture 
Duck Stab! was mentioned in the 1993 song "Whiteness Thy Name Is Meltonian" from the album This Leaden Pall by Half Man Half Biscuit.

References 

1978 EPs
The Residents albums